Launched in 2003 by PMMI Media Group (formerly Summit Media Group, Inc.), Automation World is a monthly publication which covers the latest developments in the automation field. Each issue contains articles in the following departments: Operations & Engineering Skills, Managers & Executives Skills, IT & Networking Skills. Feature articles, safety and security issues, industry news and a monthly Product World roundup are also included with monthly issues, along with one of three quarterly supplements - Industrial Ethernet Review, Packaging Automation Review, and Wireless World Review.

History and profile
The first issue of Automation World was published in June 2003.

Director of Content and Editor-in-Chief David Greenfield and his editorial team cover the success of manufacturing through the implementation of automation, showcasing best practices and solutions for systems, software, networks and control products at the highest level. 

As of December 2010, the audited BPA circulation of Automation World was 56,336 subscribers.

References

External links
Automation World website
Optimized Automation, related site

Business magazines published in the United States
Monthly magazines published in the United States
Magazines established in 2003
Magazines published in Chicago
Professional and trade magazines